Tsumadinsky District is an administrative and municipal district (raion), one of the forty-one in the Republic of Dagestan, Russia. It is located in the west of the republic. Its administrative center is the rural locality (a selo) of Agvali. As of the 2010 Census, the total population of the district was 23,345, with the population of Agvali accounting for 10.5% of that number.

Administrative and municipal status
Within the framework of administrative divisions, Tsumadinsky District is one of the forty-one in the Republic of Dagestan. The district is divided into thirteen selsoviets which comprise fifty-eight rural localities. As a municipal division, the district is incorporated as Tsumadinsky Municipal District. Its thirteen selsoviets are incorporated as twenty-three rural settlements within the municipal district. The selo of Agvali serves as the administrative center of both the administrative and municipal district.

References

Notes

Sources

Districts of Dagestan
